Qaraguz or Qareh Guz (قره گوز), may refer to:
 Qaraguz-e Hajji Baba
 Qaraguz-e Il
 Qaraguz-e Salimaqa